This is the discography of OPM music band Cueshé.

Albums

Studio albums

Compilation albums
2005 – UltraelectromagneticJam
2006 – Mga Awit Kapuso: The Best of GMA TV Themes Vol. 3
2006 – Hopia Mani Popcorn: The Best of Manila Sound Vol. 2
2009 – The Best of Mga Awit Kapuso

Singles

Mainstream singles

1 Single currently charting
2 Upcoming single
3 Radio-only single

Covers Singles

Hard To Believe (Original by Eraserheads, 2005)
Laki Sa Layaw (Original by Mike Hanopol, 2009)

Other singles

References

Discographies of Filipino artists
Rock music group discographies